Dysalotus is a genus of fish in the family Chiasmodontidae found in the Atlantic, Indian and Pacific Ocean.

Species
There are currently 3 recognized species in this genus:
 Dysalotus alcocki MacGilchrist, 1905
 Dysalotus oligoscolus R. K. Johnson & Cohen, 1974
 Dysalotus pouliulii M. R. S. de Melo, 2016

References

Chiasmodontidae
Marine fish genera